NNOA may refer to:

 National Naval Officers Association
 Norwegian Narcotic Officers Association